The Kinkaid Limestone is a geologic formation in Indiana.

References

Geology of Indiana